Noa Kirel (born Noya Kirel; 10 April 2001) is an Israeli singer, actress, dancer and television host. She won the MTV Europe Music Awards for the best Israeli act between 2017 and 2021. She is set to represent Israel in the Eurovision Song Contest 2023 with the song "Unicorn".

Early life
Noa Kirel was born and raised in Ra'anana, Israel, to Israeli-born parents of Ashkenazi Jewish (Austrian-Jewish) descent and of both  Sephardi Jewish and Mizrahi Jewish (Moroccan-Jewish) descent. She is the youngest child of Amir and Ilana Kirel and has two older brothers. Her father is the CEO of Glassco Glass, an imported-glass business headquartered at the Barkan industrial park. On her father's side, Kirel has relatives who were murdered in the Holocaust.

Her parents named her Noya but after she was diagnosed with a serious kidney illness at three months old, a rabbi suggested a name change to Noa ("Noa" can also spell "movement" in Hebrew). He also jokingly predicted back then that she might even become a dancer.

In February 2020, Kirel was drafted into the Israel Defense Forces (IDF), and served in a unique military band. She received an honorable discharge, completing her two-year mandatory service on 14 February 2022.

Career
Kirel appeared in the Pushers documentary series from HOT, which tracks parents who push their children to success in different areas. The show featured Kirel and her father, who was financially supporting her entertainment career. Kirel is managed in Israel by Roberto Ben-Shoshan and co-managed by Sharona Nomder (Morse Artists) internationally.

In 2015 she performed her first song on YouTube named "Medabrim?". Following its success, that year she released another song called "Killer". The provocative video clip for the song caused a stir due to Kirel's young age. She released additional songs, which were featured on YouTube and played on various Israeli radio stations, including the songs "Yesh Be Ahava", which was the first song to enter the Galgalatz playlist, "Rak Ata", "Hatzi Meshuga", "Bye Lahofesh" and "Ten Li Siman". At the end of 2016, she won the award "Singer of the Year" at the Israeli Kids' Choice Awards. 

In 2017, Kirel began hosting the "Lipstar" musical program on kidZ channel, alongside Sagi Breitner. In May 2017, she released a song called "Makom Leshinuy" which she sang in a duet with Avior Melasa who wrote the song. Kirel released several other songs that year which were all marketing singles: "Lirkod", "Kimeat Meforsemet", "Wow", "Mi Yiten Li Et Ha'Koach". 

On June 22, she starred in the teen movie Nearly Famous, alongside Omer Dror. That year, she also appeared in the theater production "The Three Musketeers" alongside Omer Dror. On August 28, Kirel released a single which she performed with Agam Bohbut, a cover version of Danny Sanderson's song; "Etzel Ha'Doda ve Ha'Dod", as part of a campaign for Bezeq. In November 2017, she represented Israel at the "MTV Europe Music Awards", in the "International Artist" category.

In January 2018, she starred in the television series Kfula playing herself and Kitty Popper (Libby Omer), a blogger who writes anything that happens to her famous self. The series aired on the KidZ channel on yes and HOT. On February 18, she appeared in Israel's Got Talent as a judge. On March 25, 2018, she released the single "Megibor Le'Oyev". On May 1 of that year, she appeared in the series "Shilton Ha'Tzlalim" as Basemet. 
On August 9, a theater production Kfula show starring Kirel and the stars of the Kfula series opened in Menora Mivtachim Arena. On August 20, the theme song for the  #Freestyle Festigal production was released. In early September 2018, a full-length movie came out to promote the show. The show ran from November 13, 2018 to January 8, 2019. On September 5, Kirel featured in the song "Cinderella" of The Ultras. On September 20, she collaborated with "Ma Kashur Trio" and Itai Levy on a new cover version of Arik Sinai's "Siba Tova" song, "Hine Ze Ba", for a HOT campaign. In October, Kirel was selected for the second time to represent Israel at the MTV Europe Music Awards but was unable to attend the ceremony in Spain due to a tight schedule. 

That month, Kirel was hired as a presenter for a new cosmetic company, "Keff."  On November 2, she released the song "Zikaron Yashan" in collaboration with Israeli singer Jonathan Mergui, as part of the Festigal. On November 11, the cast of the 2018 Festigal, including Kirel, released the original song "Tinshom" with a video clip. On November 23, she participated in a memorial tribute to Amir Fryszer Guttman. In December 2018, Kirel led a campaign with the KidZ Channel and the Israeli National Road Safety Authority promoting wearing a helmet while cycling. In May 2020 she participated in a yes commercial. In November 2020, Kirel joined 39 other Israeli artists for charity single Katan Aleinu to support hospitals battling the COVID-19 pandemic.

In June 2020,  Kirel signed a contract with the American label, Atlantic Records. In December of that year, Kirel signed with WME.

In March 2021, it was announced that Kirel would star in a feature film produced by Picturestart. In May 2021, Kirel in collaboration with Israeli singer Omer Adam, released a remix version of the national anthem of the state of Israel, Hatikvah. The collaboration was criticized, with many calling it "disrespectful" and "embarrassing". In honor of Pride Month, Kirel and Israeli comedian Ilan Peled released the single "Trilili Tralala". the single won the status of a Gay anthem in Israel and reached number two on Media Forest's Israeli singles chart upon its release.

On July 14, 2021, she released her first international single, "Please Don't Suck". On October 15, 2021, she released the single "Bad Little Thing" which she also opened Miss Universe 2021.

On January 12, 2022 she released the single "Thought About That".

On July 11, 2022, she was chosen by the Israeli Public Broadcasting Corporation (Kan) to represent Israel at the Eurovision Song Contest 2023. The following day, Kirel stated that she had not decided yet, and would make a decision later on. On August 10, she confirmed that she would compete at the contest. Her competing song, "Unicorn", was released on 8 March 2023.

Personal life
She has been in a relationship with Israeli model and actor Tomer HaCohen since October 2021.

Discography

Singles

Filmography

See also
Music of Israel
Women of Israel

References

External links

2001 births
Living people
21st-century Israeli women singers
Israeli pop singers
People from Ra'anana
Israeli Ashkenazi Jews
Israeli Sephardi Jews
Israeli Mizrahi Jews
Israeli people of Austrian-Jewish descent
Israeli people of Moroccan-Jewish descent
Atlantic Records artists
English-language singers from Israel
Eurovision Song Contest entrants for Israel
Eurovision Song Contest entrants of 2023